Lewis Rhys Thomas (born 20 September 1997) is a Welsh professional footballer who plays as a goalkeeper for EFL League One side Forest Green Rovers.

He came through the youth-team at Swansea City and played on loan at Carmarthen Town, before signing with Forest Green Rovers in June 2018.

Club career

Swansea City
Thomas joined the Academy at Swansea City at the age of nine and signed his first professional contract with the club in July 2015. During his time at the Liberty Stadium he helped the "Swans" to win three FAW Youth Cup titles and was part of the Premier League 2 double-winning squad in the 2016–17 season. On 31 January 2018, joined Carmarthen Town on loan to cover for injured goalkeeper Lee Idzi. He played four Welsh Premier League and one Welsh Cup game for the "Old Gold".

Forest Green Rovers
On 19 June 2018, Thomas signed a two-year contract with Forest Green Rovers, who were about to embark on their first season in the English Football League. He was the third goalkeeper to join the Green that summer, with goalkeeping coach Pat Mountain also bringing in James Montgomery and Robert Sánchez. He made his debut in professional football on the opening day of the 2019–20 season, keeping a clean sheet in a 1–0 win over Oldham Athletic at The New Lawn on 3 August. He signed a new contract with Forest Green Rovers in November 2019.

Career statistics

Honours
Swansea City U23
Premier League 2: 2016–17
Premier League Cup: 2016–17

References

1997 births
Living people
Footballers from Swansea
Welsh footballers
Wales youth international footballers
Association football goalkeepers
Cymru Premier players
English Football League players
Swansea City A.F.C. players
Carmarthen Town A.F.C. players
Forest Green Rovers F.C. players